Oliver Peter St John, 9th Earl of Orkney (born 27 February 1938) is the son of Frederick Oliver St John  whose parents were Sir Frederic Robert and Lady St. John (née Isabella Annie FitzMaurice). 

He is a retired Canadian political scientist and Scottish peer. He was a lecturer at University College London, England, before moving to the University of Manitoba, Canada, where he rose to become professor of political studies. He retired from academia in 1998, the year he succeeded to the Earldom of Orkney, and was appointed a senior scholar by Manitoba.

Personal life
In 1963, St John married Mary Juliet Scott-Brown. Together they had four children: one son and three daughters. Their son, Oliver Robert St John, Viscount Kirkwall, is heir to the earldom. His first marriage ended in divorce in 1985, and that year he married Mary Barbara Huck (née Albertson). His second marriage brought four step-children. As a male-line descendant of the 3rd Viscount Bolingbroke, he is also in remainder to this title.

Selected works

Notes

References

1938 births
Academics of University College London
Alumni of the London School of Economics
Canadian political scientists
Earls of Orkney
Canadian international relations scholars
Living people
Terrorism studies
University of British Columbia alumni
Academic staff of the University of Manitoba
People from Victoria, British Columbia
Scientists from British Columbia
 People educated at Woodbridge School

Orkney